Ogami is a dialect spoken on Ogami Island

Ogami may also refer to:

 Ogami Daigoro, a protagonist in the manga series Lone Wolf and Cub
 Ogami Ichiro, a protagonist in the video game series Sakura Wars
 Ogami Ittō, a protagonist in the manga series Lone Wolf and Cub
 Ogami Island, one of the islands of the Miyako Islands
 Ogami Lighthouse, a lighthouse located on (a different) Ogami Island
 Reiji Oogami, a character in the video game series The King of Fighters

See also
 Megami (disambiguation)